Carlos Mora may refer to:

 Carlos Mora (volleyball) (born 1990), Spanish volleyball player
 Carlos Mora (footballer) (born 2001), Costa Rican footballer